Apocynum cannabinum (dogbane, amy root, hemp dogbane, prairie dogbane, Indian hemp, rheumatism root, or wild cotton) is a perennial herbaceous plant that grows throughout much of North America—in the southern half of Canada and throughout the United States. It is poisonous to humans, dogs, cats, and horses. All parts of the plant are toxic and can cause cardiac arrest if ingested. Some Lepidoptera feed on this plant, such as a hummingbird moth.

Description
The stems are reddish and contain a milky latex. It flowers from July to August, has large sepals, and a five-lobed white corolla. The flowers are hermaphrodite, with both male and female organs.

Taxonomy

Etymology
Apocynum means "poisonous to dogs". The specific epithet cannabinum, and the common names hemp dogbane and Indian hemp refer to its similarity to Cannabis as a source of fiber. It likely got its name from its resemblance to a European species of the same name. The Maidu Concow people call the plant pö (Konkow language).

Distribution and habitat
Apocynum cannabinum grows in open wooded areas, ditches, and hillsides. It is found in gravelly or sandy soil, mainly near streams in shady or moist places. It is native to much of North America—in the southern half of Canada and throughout the United States.

Ecology
In gardens, the species can be unwanted, sprouting from spreading roots. When growing among corn, Apocynum cannabinum can reduce yields by up to 10%, and among soybeans by up to 40%. It can be controlled through mechanical means, although it is difficult to control with herbicides.

The plant serves as a larval host for the snowberry clearwing (Hemaris diffinis), which is a pollinator that resembles a small hummingbird. It is also a host plant for the dogbane tiger moth (Cycnia tenera) and the zebra caterpillar (Melanchra picta). The larvae of Marmara apocynella feed on the stems, making a "long whitish serpentine mine".

Toxicity
It is poisonous to humans, dogs, cats, and horses. All parts of the plant are toxic, and the plant contains cardiac glycosides. The stems contain a white sap capable of causing skin blisters.

Uses

Fiber
The stalks of Apocynum cannabinum have been used as a source of fiber by Native Americans to make bows, fire-bows, nets, tie down straps, hunting nets, fishing lines, bags, and clothing.

Food
The seeds have an edible use as a meal (raw or cooked) when ground into a powder.

Chewing gum
The plant's latex sap can be squeezed from the plant and allowed to stand overnight to harden into a white gum which can be used (sometimes mixed with clean clay) as chewing gum.

Phytoremediation
Apocynum cannabinum can be used to sequester lead in its biomass by taking it up from the soil through its roots. This process, called phytoremediation, could help clean sites contaminated with lead.

Medicinal

It is used in herbal medicine to treat fever and to slow the pulse. Apocynum cannabinum has been employed by various Native American tribes to treat a wide variety of complaints including rheumatism, coughs, pox, whooping cough, asthma, internal parasites, diarrhea, and to increase lactation. The root has been used as a tonic, cardiotonic, diaphoretic, diuretic, an emetic (to induce vomiting), and an expectorant. It is harvested in the autumn and dried for later use. The fresh root is medicinally the most active part. A weak tea made from the dried root has been used for cardiac diseases and as a vermifuge (an agent that expels parasitic worms). The milky sap is a folk remedy for genital warts.

References

Further reading

 
 Davis, A.; Renner, K.; Sprague, C.; Dyer, L.; Mutch, D. (2005) "Integrated Weed Management: One Year's Seeding." Michigan State University Extension Bulletin E-2931. East Lansing, Michigan. Accession Number LTER62246.
 
 Native American Ethnobotany DB: Apocynum cannabinum

External links

 Jepson Manual Treatment – Apocynum cannabinum
 

Apocyneae
Fiber plants
Flora of North America
Plants used in traditional Native American medicine
Butterfly food plants
Phytoremediation plants
Poisonous plants
Plants described in 1753
Taxa named by Carl Linnaeus